Eupithecia idaeoides is a moth in the family Geometridae. It is found in southern India (West Bengal and Sikkim).

The wingspan is about 16 mm. The forewings are pale grey with a yellowish tinge and the hindwings are slightly paler light grey, also with a yellowish tinge.

References

Moths described in 2010
idaeoides
Moths of Asia